Chandler is a town in Murray County, Minnesota, United States. The population was 270 at the 2010 census.

Geography

Minnesota State Highway 91 and Murray County Roads 4 and 5 are the main routes in the community.

Demographics

2010 census
As of the census of 2010, there were 270 people, 109 households, and 75 families living in the city. The racial makeup of the city was 88.9% White, 0.7% African American, 9.6% from other races, and 0.7% from two or more races. Hispanic or Latino of any race were 22.6% of the population.

There were 109 households, of which 32.1% had children under the age of 18 living with them, 57.8% were married couples living together, 6.4% had a female householder with no husband present, 4.6% had a male householder with no wife present, and 31.2% were non-families. 26.6% of all households were made up of individuals, and 19.3% had someone living alone who was 65 years of age or older. The average household size was 2.48 and the average family size was 3.01.

The median age in the city was 41 years. 24.1% of residents were under the age of 18; 8.5% were between the ages of 18 and 24; 23.7% were from 25 to 44; 21.5% were from 45 to 64; and 22.2% were 65 years of age or older. The gender makeup of the city was 50.4% male and 49.6% female.

2000 census
As of the census of 2000, there were 276 people, 113 households, and 72 families living in the city. The racial makeup of the city was 97.46% White, 1.81% from other races, and 0.72% from two or more races. Hispanic or Latino of any race were 17.39% of the population.

There were 113 households, out of which 24.8% had children under the age of 18 living with them, 57.5% were married couples living together, 3.5% had a female householder with no husband present, and 35.4% were non-families. 33.6% of all households were made up of individuals, and 26.5% had someone living alone who was 65 years of age or older.  The average household size was 2.44 and the average family size was 3.14.

In the city, the population was spread out, with 24.6% under the age of 18, 8.7% from 18 to 24, 19.2% from 25 to 44, 20.3% from 45 to 64, and 27.2% who were 65 years of age or older.  The median age was 43 years. For every 100 females, there were 102.9 males.  For every 100 females age 18 and over, there were 87.4 males.

The median income for a household in the city was $26,875, and the median income for a family was $38,542. Males had a median income of $30,417 versus $20,000 for females. The per capita income for the city was $16,134.  About 6.8% of families and 15.1% of the population were below the poverty line, including 27.3% of those under the age of eighteen and 14.0% of those 65 or over.

History
A post office has been in operation at Chandler since 1886. The city was named for John Alonzo Chandler, a railroad official.

Chandler Air Force Station was located just south of town from 1951 though 1969, home to 787th Aircraft Control and Warning Squadron.

On June 16, 1992, Chandler was struck by a devastating F5 tornado that completely destroyed half of the town, most of which has since been rebuilt.

The Fenton Wind Farm, a 137 turbine wind farm near Chandler, became operational in 2007.

Politics
Chandler is located in Minnesota's 7th congressional district, represented by Republican Michelle Fischbach. At the state level, Chandler is located in Senate District 22, represented by Republican Bill Weber, and in House District 22A, represented by Republican Joe Schomacker.

References

External links
 City of Chandler 

Cities in Minnesota
Cities in Murray County, Minnesota